The Scania GPRT range, later known as the Scania 2-series, is a truck model range introduced in 1980 by Swedish truck manufacturer Scania. It is the successor of the "1-series". The 2-series came in a range of different engine sizes and power ratings from 7.8 litres I6 to a 14.2-litre V8 engine. Production of the 2-series was stopped after the 3-series were introduced in 1987, but the production of the 2-series continued in Argentina and Brazil until 1992. The range was first shown in the spring of 1980 as the bonneted (conventional-cab) T-series (for "Torpedo", not to be confused with the 2004 T-series). The cab, also featuring an all-new interior, was designed by Giorgetto Giugiaro. The 2-series was also manufactured by Scania's Brazilian operations, beginning in 1982. In 1984, the 8.5-litre "92" series was added.

Letter suffixes M, H, or E, relate to frame/suspension ratings - "medium", "heavy", or "extra-heavy" duty. Prefixes used are as follows:

 G - rigidly mounted short, low cab
 P - suspended low cab, short or long (single berth)
 R - high cab, short or long (double berth)
 T - bonneted (conventional) cab, short or long (double berth)

Bonneted (conventional-cab) model (T)

At the time of introduction, the 2-series "T" was available with either a 7.8, 11.0, or 14.2-litre engine. These were denoted 82, 112, or 142.

See also

Scania 3-series

References

2Series
Vehicles introduced in 1980